The Eddie Wright Raceway is a British race track in Scunthorpe, North Lincolnshire. It is primarily used for motorcycle speedway, but also occasionally hosts stock car racing.

History
The track is located on Normanby Road in Scunthorpe.

In 2008, used car dealership Eddie Wright entered into a 29-year sponsorship deal with Scunthorpe Scorpions to rename the track the Eddie Wright Raceway.

Usage

Speedway
The home teams are the Premier League team Scunthorpe Scorpions and also formerly the National League/Conference League Scunthorpe Saints.

Bangers & Stockcars
The Eddie Wright Raceway also host's banger and stockcar events every 3–4 weeks from March - November.

Statistics
Length: 285 metres
Width: 18 metres (bends), 15 metres (straights)
Record Lap Time (Speedway): 55.92 seconds by David Howe on 24 April 2009

References

Motorsport venues in England
Sports venues in Scunthorpe
Speedway venues in England